Frans Ben Callado is a Colombian-Québécois composer, writer and visual artist, of Spanish heritage.

Biography

Born in Montreal in 1978, he grew up in Madrid and near London. He studied composition with John Woolrich, Michel Gonneville and Michel Longtin. A pianist and improviser, he is the author of numerous compositions, written for different soloists and ensembles, such as Ensemble Allogène, Ensemble Chorum and Toronto's New Music Concerts. A founding member of the experimental rock collective, Concorde Crash (2001–06), he has organised many multidisciplinary cabarets and events in Montreal. Also a translator and blogger, his literary output is written in three languages: Spanish, French and English. In 2010, he participated in the International Poetry Festival at Colima, México, translating his own poems. He took part in the 40th anniversary of the Nuit de la Poésie.

Publications

Visages après l'averse, Poètes de brousse, 2007
Faire Confiance à un animal, Poètes de brousse, 2010
 Musique de création et spiritualité : forum à sept voix, under the supervision of Maxime McKinley (Revue Circuit, vol. 21, no. 1, pp. 61–74), 2011

Compositions (selective list)

 L'Ange Gauche (1997–99)
 Neuf Orbites autour de la lune (2000)
 Symphony no.1 « Résistance » (2001–2002)
 Échantillons d'un Bestiaire (lieder) (2002–2003)
 Cantiques d'Hypnos (lieder) (2003)
 Les Américains Brefs (opera) (2003)
 Ungesetzliche-lieder (2004)
 Musique pour une grève étudiante (2005)
 Le Parcours de Naunet (2005)
 Circulation des noms, des âmes, des dons et des esprits (2005)
 Naos (2006)
 Le Livre Caché (2006)
 Sanatorium (2007)
 Black Boxes (2008)
 Tientos del Guadarrama (2008–09)
 Symphony no.2 « De Profundis » (2008–09)
 Concertino for bassoon and strings (2009)
 Officium pro Defunctis (2010)
 Punctum Remotum (2010)

References

External links
DEMENTIA UNIVERSALIS (Frans Ben Callado's blog) 

21st-century Canadian poets
Canadian poets in French
Canadian composers
Canadian male composers
Writers from Montreal
Canadian people of Spanish descent
1978 births
Living people
Canadian male poets
21st-century Canadian male writers